"Through It All" is the first single by American rock band From Ashes to New's Downfall EP and their debut album Day One. The single was first released on November 21, 2015. Since its release, the song has peaked at No. 6 on the Billboard Mainstream rock chart.

Music video
A lyric video was premiered on August 10, 2015. The music video was released on November 13, 2015 and was directed by Jim Forster. It features "a young couple going through some highs and lows in their relationship".

Charts

References

2015 singles
From Ashes to New songs
2015 songs